The 1918 Saint Louis Billikens football team was an American football team that represented Saint Louis University during the 1918 college football season. In their first and only season under head coach Ernest C. Quigley, the Billikens compiled a 3–2–1 record and outscored opponents by a total of 136 to 36. The team played its home games at Sportsman's Park at St. Louis.

Schedule

References

Saint Louis
Saint Louis Billikens football seasons
Saint Louis Billikens football